Theodore Lyman Eliot Jr. (January 24, 1928 – August 8, 2019) was an American diplomat who served as the U.S. Ambassador to Afghanistan from 1973 to 1978. He was a member of the American Academy of Diplomacy and Boston's Eliot family. 

Eliot graduated from Harvard College in 1948 and received a Master of Public Administration from Harvard Kennedy School in 1956. He also served as Dean of the Fletcher School of Law and Diplomacy at Tufts University and as Secretary General for the United States of the Bilderberg Meetings from 1981 to October 1993.

References

1928 births
2019 deaths
20th-century American diplomats
Ambassadors of the United States to Afghanistan
Eliot family (America)
Harvard College alumni
Harvard Kennedy School alumni
Members of the Steering Committee of the Bilderberg Group
United States Foreign Service personnel